Maurice Teynac (1915–1992) was a French actor. In 1948 he starred in the film The Lame Devil under Sacha Guitry.

In 1954 he appeared in London's West End in J.B. Priestley's poorly reviewed play The White Countess.

Selected filmography 

 Romance of Paris (1941)- Maurice
 The Pavilion Burns (1941)
  (1942) - Leroy
 Le Destin fabuleux de Désirée Clary (1942) - Marmont
  (1943) - L'imitateur
 Song of the Clouds (1946)
 Counter Investigation (1947) - Serge de Souquières
 Criminal Brigade (1947) - Fred
 La Fleur de l'âge (1947)
 Le Comédien (1948) - L'auteur dramatique
 Woman Without a Past (1948) - Chimerowitz
 Night Express (1948) - Georges Sommer
 The Lame Devil (1948) - Charles X
 Fantomas Against Fantomas (1949) - Fantômas
 The Barton Mystery (1949) - Barton
  (1949) - Freville
 Mystery in Shanghai (1950) - Inspecteur Wens
 Les mousquetaires du roi (1951)
 The Red Rose (1951) - Jean Maréchal - le cinéaste
 Night Without Stars (1951) - Louis Malinay
  (1951)
 La Poison (1951) - Un avocat (uncredited)
 Massacre in Lace (1952) - Sophocle Zélos
  (1952) - Heldinge (segment "Le mort dans l'ascenseur")
 The Road to Damascus (1952) - Le Christ
 Illusion in a Minor Key (1952) - Night Club Singer Herr Gidou
 My Childish Father (1953) - Lucien Landier
 Cinema d'altri tempi (1953) - Za l'Amour
 Royal Affairs in Versailles (1954) - Monsieur de Montespan (uncredited)
 The Beautiful Otero (1954) - Mountfeller
  (1954) - Dr. Curtiss
 Napoléon (1955) - Le comte Emmanuel de Las Cases
 Bedevilled (1955) - Trevelle
 The Affair of the Poisons (1955) - Nicolas de la Reynie
 Les insoumises (1956) - René Perrault
  (1956) - Bernard Dufresnes
 The Seventh Commandment (1957) - Labaroche
 Love in Jamaica (1957)
 Les Suspects (1957) - Kurt Topfer
 The Mysteries of Paris (1957)
 Paris Holiday (1958) - Doctor Bernais
 Sans famille (1958) - James Milligan
  (1960) - Le virtuose
 Crack in the Mirror (1960) - Doctor
 Austerlitz (1960) - Schulmeister
 La Mort de Belle (1961) - L'ivrogne / Stephane's Friend
 Captain Fracasse (1961) - Marquis des Bruyères
  (1962) - Levasseur
 Le Diable et les Dix Commandements (1962) - Father Superior (segment "Homicide point ne seras")
 The Gypsy Baron (1962) - Carnero
 The Merry Widow (1962) - André Napoleon Renard
 The Trial (1962) - Deputy Manager
 Une blonde comme ça (1963)
 The Reluctant Spy (1963) - Alfred Thirios
 L'honorable Stanislas, agent secret (1963) - Alfred Thirios
 In the French Style (1963) - Baron Edward de Chassier
 Henri-Georges Clouzot's Inferno (1964) - M. Bordure
  (1965) - L'inspecteur Legris
 The Uninhibited (1965) - Reginald
 The Night of the Generals (1967) - A General (uncredited)
  (1968) - Le patron
 Therese and Isabelle (1968) - Monsieur Martin
  (1968) - Stanmore
 Mayerling (1968) - Moritz Szeps
  (1968, TV miniseries) - Mr. Dobbins, Teacher
 State of Siege (1972) - Minister of Internal Security
 The Day of the Jackal (1973) - Bastien-Thiry's Lawyer
 Ash Wednesday (1973) - Doctor Lambert
  (1974) - Un comédien dans 'Protée'
 Special Section (1975) - Le substitut général Lucien Guillet
 L'Année sainte (1976) - Marcel Scandini
 Birgitt Haas Must Be Killed (1981) - Chamrode
  (1983) - Spencer
 Camille (1984) (TV film) - Joseph

External links

References

1915 births
1992 deaths
French male film actors
20th-century French male actors
French theatre directors
Burials at Batignolles Cemetery